is a Japanese international rugby union player who plays as a prop. He currently plays for Canon Eagles in Japan's domestic Top League.

Club career

After graduating from university, Higashionna signed for the Canon Eagles ahead of the 2015 Top League season.   He started 4 times and make 4 substitute appearances in his rookie year.   In 2016 he firmly established himself as a regular in the starting XV, starting all 9 of Canon's games prior to the mid-season break for the November internationals.

International

A strong showing in his first Top League season saw Higashionna earn his first cap for  during the 2016 Asia Rugby Championship. Higashionna debuted in an 85-0 win against  on 30 April 2016.

After earning 3 caps during the Asian Rugby Championship, Higashionna made his first appearance against non-Asian opposition during the 2016 end-of-year rugby union internationals.

References

1992 births
Living people
Japanese rugby union players
Japan international rugby union players
Rugby union props
Teikyo University alumni
Yokohama Canon Eagles players
People from Okinawa Prefecture